In knot theory, Willerton's fish is an unexplained relationship between the first two Vassiliev invariants of a knot.

The region appears to be bounded by cubic curves, suggesting that the crossing number, and  may be related to each other by not-yet-proven inequalities.

This shape is named after Simon Willerton, who first observed this phenomenon and described the shape of the scatterplots as "fish-like".

References

Knot theory